Francisco Salvador López Brito (born 4 October 1949) is a Mexican politician affiliated with the PAN. He currently serves as Senator of the LXII Legislature of the Mexican Congress representing Sinaloa. He also served as Deputy during the LVI Legislature.

References

1949 births
Living people
Politicians from Sinaloa
Members of the Senate of the Republic (Mexico)
Members of the Chamber of Deputies (Mexico)
National Action Party (Mexico) politicians
20th-century Mexican politicians
21st-century Mexican politicians
Universidad Autónoma de Guadalajara alumni
National Autonomous University of Mexico alumni
Members of the Congress of Sinaloa
Municipal presidents in Sinaloa